The Mowchadz) is a river in Belarus, a left tributary of the Neman. It originates in Baranavichy District, Brest Region. It then flows north through Dzyatlava District in Grodno Region, passing through the localities of Molchad and Hiezhaly.

For a long time it formed the border between Navahrudak and Slonim powiats in Nowogródek Voivodeship.

Bibliography 
 Блакітная кніга Беларусі: Энцыкл. / БелЭн; Рэдкал.: Н.А. Дзісько і інш. — Мн.: БелЭн, 1994. — Паводле эл.рэсурса poseidon.by
 Ресурсы поверхностных вод СССР. Описание рек и озёр и расчёты основных характеристик их режима. Т. 5. Белоруссия и Верхнее Поднепровье. Ч. 1—2. — Л., 1971
 Природа Белоруссии: Попул. энцикл./ БелСЭ; Редкол.: И.П. Шамякин (гл.ред.) и др. — Мн.: БелСЭ, 1986. — 599 с., 40 л. ил.

External links 
 -{Индексный поиск по водоемам Беларуси - Река Молчадь}-

Rivers of Belarus
Rivers of Brest Region
Rivers of Grodno Region